Charles Eloundou (born 4 December 1994) is a Cameroonian professional footballer who plays as a left winger for Cypriot club Anorthosis.

Club career
Eloundou began his career with Cameroonian side AS Fortuna de Mfou. He has played on loan with fellow Cameroonian sides Coton Sport FC and Unisport Bafang. While with Unisport he scored 9 goals in 20 matches. His play in Cameroon brought him to the attention of Major League Soccer sides.

On 25 January 2013, Eloundou signed with the Colorado Rapids of Major League Soccer on a one-year loan with an option for a permanent transfer at the end of the 2013 season. He was signed via the MLS weighted lottery process, where Real Salt Lake and D.C. United also had the chance to acquire him.

Eloundou signed with the North American Soccer League's Jacksonville Armada FC on 10 March 2016. Eloundou joined the Armada at the beginning of February and at the time of his signing, led Jacksonville in preseason scoring with three goals.

International career
Eloundou has been a prominent member of the Cameroon's Under-17 and Under-20 national teams. He played four matches for the Cameroon B side in the 2012 Nehru Cup. He was called up by the full national team for a friendly match against Tanzania on 6 February 2013 in Dar es Salaam, Tanzania. He made his senior national team debut in that game, coming on as a substitute in the 60th minute. The game ended in a 1–0 loss.

References

External links

WestAfricanFootball.com profile

1994 births
Living people
Footballers from Yaoundé
Association football forwards
Cameroonian footballers
Cameroonian expatriate footballers
Cameroonian expatriate sportspeople in the United States
Cameroon under-20 international footballers
Cameroon international footballers
Unisport Bafang players
Colorado Rapids players
Charlotte Independence players
Colorado Springs Switchbacks FC players
Jacksonville Armada FC players
Nea Salamis Famagusta FC players
Expatriate soccer players in the United States
Major League Soccer players
USL Championship players
North American Soccer League players